Ian Banks may refer to:

 Iain Banks (1954–2013), Scottish writer
 Ian Banks (One Tree Hill), fictional character on the American television series One Tree Hill
 Ian Banks (footballer) (born 1961), former footballer and current manager of A.F.C. Emley